Jake Pickard (born 14 March 1997) is an English footballer who plays as a midfielder for Northern League Division One club Washington, who formerly played for Queen of the South in the Scottish Championship.

Career
Born in Newcastle upon Tyne, Pickard began his career at Queen of the South and was first called up to a senior game on 22 November 2014 in a 2–0 home victory over Raith Rovers in the Scottish Championship. A week later Pickard made his debut in the fourth round of the Scottish Cup, replacing goalscorer Derek Lyle for the final four minutes of a 4–1 win versus Brora Rangers at Palmerston Park. Pickard's league debut was on 24 January 2015 when he replaced Ian McShane for the final eight minutes of a 2–0 home defeat to Hibernian. Pickard appeared a further ten times, all as a substitute, as his team reached the promotion play-offs.

Pickard departed the Doonhamers on 20 January 2017, in an attempt to find first-team football away from Dumfries.

In February 2017, Pickard signed for Washington for the second half of the 2016–17 season and was retained for the 2017–18 season.

References

External links

Living people
1997 births
Footballers from Newcastle upon Tyne
English footballers
Association football forwards
Queen of the South F.C. players
Scottish Professional Football League players